The Greenpoint Avenue Bridge is a drawbridge that carries Greenpoint Avenue across Newtown Creek between the neighborhoods of Greenpoint, Brooklyn and Blissville, Queens in New York City. Also known as the J. J. Byrne Memorial Bridge, the bridge is named after James J. Byrne, who served as Brooklyn Borough President from September 1926 until he died in office on March 14, 1930.  Previously, Byrne was the Brooklyn Commissioner of Public Works.

History

The Greenpoint Avenue Bridge is the sixth bridge to cross Newtown Creek in this location.  In the 1850s, Neziah Bliss built the first drawbridge, which was called the Blissville Bridge.  It was followed by three other bridges before being replaced by a new bridge in March 1900. A new bridge opened in 1929 and after suffering from mechanical problems it was replaced by the current structure in 1987.

Designed by Hardesty & Hanover, the Greenpoint Avenue Bridge was the recipient of an American Institute of Steel Construction Award in 1991.

On March 30, 2009, New York City Mayor Michael Bloomberg held a press conference at the Greenpoint Avenue Bridge, announcing that it would receive $6 million in federal stimulus funds, which will be used to rehabilitate the bridge.

In 2011, the NYCDOT proposed an extension of the existing Greenpoint Avenue bike lane on the Brooklyn side across the bridge into Queens. The project was completed in 2015.

References

External links

 

Bascule bridges in the United States
Bridges completed in 1987
Road bridges in New York City
Bridges in Brooklyn
Bridges in Queens, New York
1987 establishments in New York City
Greenpoint, Brooklyn
Pedestrian bridges in New York City
Steel bridges in the United States